Paul Douglas Watson (born 4 January 1975) is an English former footballer.

During his career, Watson played for Gillingham, Fulham, Brentford, Coventry City and most notably for Brighton & Hove Albion before dropping into non-League football and playing for Woking, Rushden & Diamonds, Crawley Town and finally Bognor Regis Town.

After retiring from football, Watson studied a part-time course at Brunel University in physiotherapy.  He was appointed as Brighton & Hove Albion's assistant physiotherapist on 11 June 2009.  He was appointed Head of First Team Physiotherapy in 2017.  He was appointed head of Sheffield United's medical team at the start of the 2017–18 season where, after gaining promotion to the Premier League in 2018-19, in their first season they shared the best injury record in the league with Wolverhampton Wanderers. He subsequently added an MSc in Sports Physiotherapy to his CV from Bath University. At the end of the 2020-21 season he left Sheffield United to start work in private practice back in his home county of Sussex. He currently works for SIXPHYSIO in Lindfield.

Honours
Football League Third Division champion (IV): 1999, 2001
Football League Second Division champion (III): 2002

External links

Whatever happened to Paul Watson?

References

1975 births
Living people
Sportspeople from Hastings
English footballers
Association football fullbacks
Gillingham F.C. players
Fulham F.C. players
Brentford F.C. players
Brighton & Hove Albion F.C. players
Coventry City F.C. players
Woking F.C. players
Rushden & Diamonds F.C. players
Crawley Town F.C. players
Bognor Regis Town F.C. players
Rye United F.C. players
English Football League players
Association football physiotherapists
British physiotherapists
Alumni of Brunel University London